Marie-Caroline of Bourbon-Two Sicilies, Duchess of Berry (Maria Carolina Ferdinanda Luise; 5 November 1798 – 16 April 1870) was an Italian princess of the House of Bourbon who married into the French royal family, and was the mother of Henri, Count of Chambord.

Life
Caroline was born at Caserta Palace in Naples. She was the eldest child of Prince Francesco, the future King Francis I of the Two Sicilies and his first wife, Archduchess Maria Clementina of Austria, the tenth child and third daughter of Leopold II, Holy Roman Emperor and Maria Luisa of Spain. Her parents were double first cousins.

Caroline was baptised with the names of her paternal grandparents, Maria Carolina of Austria and King Ferdinand of Naples, as well as her maternal grandmother Maria Luisa, Holy Roman Empress.

She spent her youth in Palermo and in Naples. Her mother died in 1801; her father married again in 1802 to Infanta Maria Isabella of Spain, another first cousin, and had twelve more children.

In 1816, French ambassador Pierre Louis Jean Casimir de Blacas arranged with the Kingdoms of Naples and Sicily  for Caroline to marry Louis XVIII of France's nephew, Charles Ferdinand, Duke of Berry. The marriage was held on 24 April 1816 in Naples.

Even though it was arranged, the marriage was happy, with Caroline and her husband living at the Élysée Palace in Paris which was given to them.

They had four children, of which the youngest two survived infancy. The elder was Louise Marie Thérèse of Artois (1819–1864). The Duke was assassinated in 1820; Caroline was then pregnant with their fourth child, Henri, Count of Chambord (1820–1883), who was dubbed the "miracle child", as his birth continued the direct Bourbon line of King Louis XIV of France (his grand-uncle the King Louis XVIII, his grandfather, the future Charles X of France, and Charles' other son Louis Antoine all had no sons). He was thus going to be the eventual heir to the throne. As his mother, Caroline became an important figure in the politics of the Bourbon Restoration.

In 1824, Louis XVIII died and was succeeded by Caroline's father-in-law as Charles X.

In the July Revolution of 1830, Charles X was overthrown. Both Charles and his elder son abdicated; but their cousin Louis Philippe of Orléans did not proclaim Henri as king. Instead Louis Philippe allowed the National Assembly to declare him king. Caroline and Henri went into exile with Charles and his family. She lived in Bath for a time, and then joined Charles and Louis Antoine in Edinburgh. Charles lived in Holyrood Palace, but Caroline (and also Louis Antoine) lived at 11 (now 12) Regent Terrace.

Caroline did not find conditions in Edinburgh agreeable, nor did she accept her son's exclusion from the throne by the Orléanist "King of the French". She declared her son to be the legitimate king, and herself to be regent. In 1831 she left Edinburgh, and returned to her family in Naples via the Netherlands, Prussia, and Austria. From Naples, with the help of the Vicomte de Saint Priest, she intrigued for a Legitimist rebellion to "restore" Henri to the throne. She also secretly married an Italian nobleman, Ettore Carlo Lucchesi-Palli, 8th  (1805–1864) on 14 December of that year.
In April 1832 she landed near Marseille. Receiving little support, she made her way to the Vendée and Brittany, where she succeeded in instigating a brief but abortive insurrection in June 1832. However, her followers were defeated. After remaining hidden for five months in a house in Nantes, she was betrayed by Simon Deutz to the government in November 1832, and imprisoned in the Chateau of Blaye.

During her incarceration, she gave birth to a daughter, and her remarriage was revealed, which lost her the sympathies of the Legitimists. She had French nationality by her marriage to the Duke of Berry, but lost it by her remarriage to an Italian; thus she was in theory ineligible to serve as regent. She was no longer an object of fear to the French government, which released her in June 1833.

She went to Sicily with her husband. The daughter born in prison died in infancy, as did another daughter born the following year, but they had four additional surviving children after that. In 1844, Caroline and her husband purchased the Ca' Vendramin Calergi palazzo on the Grand Canal in Venice from the last member of the Vendramin family line.

In the turmoil of the Risorgimento, they had to sell the palazzo to her grandson, Prince Henry, Count of Bardi, and many of its fine works of art were auctioned in Paris.  They retired to Brunnsee, near Graz in Austria. Her husband died there in 1864, and she died in 1870.

French novelist Alexandre Dumas wrote two stories about her and her plotting.

Patron of the arts
Even as a member of the royal family, the Duchess of Berry was an exceptional theatre-goer. She was the patron of the Théâtre du Gymnase, which changed its name, for a time, to the théâtre de Madame, in her honor. She attended the Odéon at least nine times during 1824 to 1828. She contributed to benefit performances, such as that of Giacomo Rossini's La dame du lac (1826), for victims of the fire at Antonio Franconi's Cirque Olympique; she contributed 500 francs.

The Duchess of Berry and her first husband, Charles-Ferdinand d'Artois, were enthusiastic art collectors. Her sale of 1822 was novel for its catalogue which contained lithographic reproductions of all the works. Lithography, invented by Alois Senefelder, had only been fully described in 1818 in Vollstandiges Lehrbuch der Steindruckerei, translated into French in 1819. The lithographs, produced by Isidore Laurent Deroy sparked an interest in the technique as a means for reproducing art.

She was a collector of landscapes; her collection featured at least three by Ruisdael. She had several genre scenes by Auguste-Xavier Leprince and she owned works by Jan van der Heyden, Michel Philibert Genod, François Marius Granet, Pauline Auzou, Jean-Claude Bonnefond, Charles Marie Bouton, Martin Drolling, Hortense Haudebourt-Lescot, and Achille Etna Michallon, among many others.

The Duchess was known to patronise the Sèvres Porcelain Manufactory, commissioning notable works by Jean-Charles-François Leloy.

Issue
Children with Charles Ferdinand, Duke of Berry:

Princess Louise Élisabeth (13 July 1817 – 14 July 1817)
Prince Louis (born and died 13 September 1818)
Princess Louise Marie Thérèse, Duchess of Parma (21 September 1819 – 1 February 1864)
Prince Henri, Duke of Bordeaux and Count of Chambord (29 September 1820 – 24 August 1883)

Children with Ettore Carlo Lucchesi-Palli, 8th Duke della Grazia, son of the Prince of Campofranco:

Anna Maria Rosalia Lucchesi-Palli (10 May 1833 – 19 August 1833); born during her mother's imprisonment at Blaye, in June 1833 she was released with her and moved to Italy, where her parents placed her in the care of a foster couple until her death, aged three months.
Clementina Lucchesi-Palli, Countess Zileri dal Verme (19 November 1835 – 22 March 1925)
Francesca di Paola Lucchesi-Palli, Princess di Arsoli (12 October 1836 – 10 May 1923); her son Camillo Massimo, Principe di Arsoli was the father-in-law of Princess Maria Adelaide of Savoy-Genoa, daughter of Prince Thomas, Duke of Genoa and his wife Princess Isabella of Bavaria; her other son Fabrizio Massimo, Principe di Roviano married Beatriz of Spain, daughter of Carlos, Duke of Madrid and his first wife Princess Margherita of Bourbon-Parma.
Maria Isabella Lucchesi-Palli, Marchesa Cavriani then Contessa di Conti (18 March 1838 – 1 April 1873)
Adinolfo Lucchesi-Palli, 9th Duke della Grazia ,Prince of Campofranco (10 March 1840 – 4 February 1911); his last son Pietro Lucchesi-Palli married Princess Beatrice of Bourbon-Parma ( daughter of Robert I, Duke of Parma and his first wife Princess Maria Pia of the Two Sicilies ) and they are the ancestors of the current Prince. His first son Enrico married Maria Raineria, daughter of Archduke Heinrich of Austria and first cousin of King Umberto I of Italy.

Ancestors

Notes

References

Further reading
Catherine Mary (Charlton) Bearne. Four Fascinating French Women. London: T. F. Unwin, 1910.
Cronin, Vincent. Four Women in Pursuit of an Ideal. London: Collins, 1965; also published as The Romantic Way. Boston: Houghton Mifflin, 1966.
Hippolyte Thirria. La duchesse de Berry (S.A.R. Madame) 1798–1870: Nombreux documents inédits. Paris: T.  J. Plange, 1900.
P. F. Willert. 
Maurice Samuels, The Betrayal of the Duchess New York: Basic Books 2020  ISBN 9781541645455

External links

1798 births
1870 deaths
Nobility from Naples
Duchesses of Berry
Princesses of Bourbon-Two Sicilies
Princesses of France (Bourbon)
Neapolitan princesses
Sicilian princesses
Italian Roman Catholics
18th-century Roman Catholics
19th-century Roman Catholics
French Roman Catholics
Daughters of kings